Banani is a village in Mali, populated by the Dogon people. Banani village is situated at the base and on the lower slopes of a mountain ridge. There is a steep road leading up to Sangha. Toro So is spoken in the village.

References

Populated places in Mopti Region